Vercelli is a surname. Notable people with the surname include:

Celestino Vercelli (1946–2020), Italian racing cyclist
Luigi Vercelli (1898–1972), Italian footballer

See also 

Albert of Vercelli (died 1214)
Atto of Vercelli (died 961), Lombard who became bishop of Vercelli in 924
Eusebius of Vercelli (283–371), bishop from Sardinia and is counted a saint
John of Vercelli (1200s–1283)
Leo of Vercelli (died 1026), German prelate who served as the Bishop of Vercelli from 999
Theonestus of Vercelli, venerated as a martyr by the Catholic Church